Bryn Mooser (born September 20, 1979, in Los Angeles) is a filmmaker and entrepreneur. In 2012, Mooser co-founded RYOT, a media company specializing in documentary film, virtual/augmented reality and branded content. Over his career, he has produced more than 200 linear and immersive films garnering multiple Emmy Awards, two Oscar nominations, a Peabody and a Cannes Lion. Mooser sold RYOT to Verizon in 2016, becoming a senior vice president and helping create the roadmap for immersive and documentary films for AOL, Yahoo, and Verizon. While at Verizon, Mooser built the branded content studio for AOL/Yahoo, HuffPost and Tumblr.

Mooser is known as a pioneer in non-fiction immersive storytelling and helped pioneer virtual reality news reporting with the Associated Press in 2015. He also helped bring augmented reality to Time magazine in 2018.

In 2019, Mooser launched XTR, a new company focused on non-fiction film and television studio based in Echo Park, Los Angeles.

Career 
Mooser began his career as a humanitarian aid worker in the Peace Corps in West Africa. In 2010 following the Haiti earthquake Mooser moved to Port-au-Prince and became the country director for Artists for Peace and Justice, while there he helped build a secondary school, and film and music school. While in Haiti, Mooser set out to build a media company with the aim of providing people with an interactive news experience and co-founded RYOT in 2012.

Following the earthquake in Nepal, Mooser got involved in virtual reality filmmaking after shooting a scene at the rubble of Kathmandu. His work expanded to include 360 video and virtual reality and aimed to provide an immersive experience whereby one could interact with the visual content and take actions, such as donating for relief operations via Apple Pay. The company later incorporated Augmented Reality into their projects as part of the goal of making documentaries more immersive.

In 2016, he sold RYOT to Verizon.

In July 2018, RYOT entered a partnership with Vice Studios to fund and co-produce documentary films. Mooser served as the CEO and co-founder of RYOT until November 2018, when he left the company to pursue new opportunities.

In 2019, Mooser's XTR closed an investment round led by the McLarty Arquette Group with investments from former AOL CEO Tim Armstrong, Airbnb co-founder Joe Gebbia, Josh Kushner, Christina and David Arquette, and Lyn and Norman Lear, and others. The company announced partnerships with Anonymous Content, VICE Studios and Futurism at the same time.

Awards and nominations
His film with David Darg, Baseball in the Time of Cholera became the winner of a jury award at the Tribeca Film Festival in 2012.

In 2016, Mooser was a Peabody Award finalist for his work in "The Gardeners of Eden". Apart from these, he has received the Kenneth Cole Courageous Class award and the Nelson Mandela Changemaker Award in 2016.

Bryn Mooser received Academy Awards nominations when he co-produced Body Team 12 with David Darg. It was nominated in the Documentary Short Subject category of the 2016 Oscars. Mooser won Emmy award for the same in "Outstanding short documentary" category.

His film Lifeboat also received a Documentary Short Subject nomination in the 2019 Oscars.

Mooser's film On Her Shoulders, for which he served as one of the executive producers, was one of the winners of the 2019 DuPont-Columbia Awards. He was brought in as a member of the Motion Picture Academy in July 2019, as part of their efforts of bringing in new members every year.

Personal life 
Bryn grew up in Bar Harbor, Maine, and went to MDI High School. He studied film at the Bennington College before joining the Peace Corps.

In an interview with Chris Morris of CNBC, Mooser talked about his mentors and mentioned Elon Musk as "a dear friend and mentor of mine". Some of his other mentors include Todd Wagner and Jason Calacanis (whom he met through Musk).  Susan Sarandon was one of his biggest mentors and had provided a voiceover for Mooser's VR film on the Nepal quake. They had earlier worked on Mooser's projects during the Haiti quake and the refugee crisis in Greece.

Mooser spent three years in the Peace Corps in West Africa and was the country director for Artists for Peace and Justice in Haiti. While in Haiti he helped build the nation's largest cholera center and a high school in Port-au-Prince that today educates nearly 3,000 Haitian youth per year. For his charitable work, he was made a recipient of the prestigious Nelson Mandela Changemaker Award, and Esquire magazine named him as one of their Americans of the Year.

References 

1979 births
Living people
People from Los Angeles
American filmmakers
American humanitarians
Bennington College alumni
Activists from California